Sijuwade Adeoye is a councillor for the Chatham Central Ward of Medway Council in England. Elected as a Labour Party candidate in 2019, she joined the Conservative Party in December 2022.

Early life
Siju Adeoye was born in Nigeria, where she attended the Sacred Heart Private School, Ibadan and Queen's School, Ibadan. Due to change in government and civil unrest in the 1980s, Adeoye's parents fled to Ireland, where she attended Collinstown Park Community College, Dublin. She finished her secondary education at La Retraite Roman Catholic Girls' School and sixth form at Saint Francis Xavier College, Clapham in South London where she obtained BTEC First and National Diplomas in Science. Adeoye had her tertiary education in Health and Social Care and postgraduate qualified in Public Health from London Metropolitan University.

Political career

Having lived in Kent for two decades, Adeoye has led local campaign issues featured on KMTV, BBC Radio Kent and BBC South East. Some of Adeoye's advocacy involves road safety, fly-tipping, drugs, gangs, vulnerability, Interventions for Young People, Children's Services, refugees, Black Lives Matter, Education, the criminal justice system and research on the impact of COVID-19 pandemic in the United Kingdom on Black, Asian and minority ethnic (BAME) communities in the United Kingdom. She spearheaded a campaign in the South East on Access and Barriers to COVID-19 Vaccination and The BAME Community, Adeoye is a voice for the residents in Chatham Central, striving for vibrant community and standing up to austerity.

Adeoye was a member of Planning Committee, Health and Adult Social Care Overview and Scrutiny Committee and Member Substitute for Medway Climate Change Advisory Group and Licensing Committee for Medway Council. She also represents the Council on the Admiralty Court, Chatham Charities Trustees, Medway Diversity Forum and School Governors to All Saints and New Road primary schools in Chatham, Medway. She was nominated by Labour to be deputy mayor of Medway in 2020.

In October 2022 Adeoye was not selected by the Labour Party to stand in another ward on Medway Council, Gillingham North. She resigned the Medway Labour Group whip – automatically excluding herself from the Labour Party.  In December 2022 she joined the Conservative Party group on the council.

Career
Outside local government work, Adeoye has chaired the Independent Monitoring Board for Stanford Hill Prison in 2018 and 2019 and still is a board member.

Adeoye has also been a speaker and campaigner for Aegis Trust and a volunteer advocate for United Nations Associations UK on Genocide Mass Atrocities and UN resolutions. She was a UK coordinator for Beibei Haven International, a non-governmental organisation addressing women's maternal health.

References

Living people
21st-century English women politicians
Alumni of London Metropolitan University
Black British women politicians
British people of Nigerian descent
Councillors in Kent
Labour Party (UK) councillors
People from Medway
Women councillors in England
Year of birth missing (living people)